Alveiro Sánchez Ramírez (born 18 November 1997) is a Colombian former footballer.

Club career
In 2014, having made his debut for Deportivo Cali, he was named in English newspaper The Guardian as one of the most promising young footballers born in 1997. In 2015, he suffered a ruptured ACL injury, stunting his development as a professional footballer.

He scored his first, and only, goal in professional football in a 2017 Copa Colombia game against Orsomarso.

International career
Sánchez represented Colombia at under-15 level.

Career statistics

Club

Notes

References

1997 births
Living people
Sportspeople from Nariño Department
Colombian footballers
Colombia youth international footballers
Association football forwards
Categoría Primera A players
Categoría Primera B players
Deportivo Cali footballers
Deportivo Pasto footballers
Orsomarso S.C. footballers